Connes is a surname. Notable people with the surname include:

Alain Connes (born 1947), French mathematician
Janine Connes (born 1934), French astronomer

See also
Conner (surname)